Red Medicine is the fourth studio album by the American post-hardcore band Fugazi, released on June 12, 1995, by Dischord Records. It is the band's most commercially successful album, peaking at number 126 on the U.S. Billboard 200 and number 18 on the UK Albums Chart.

Background
On Red Medicine, Fugazi began to move into more experimental styles of music, including noise punk, psychedelia ("By You") and dub ("Version").

Writing and recording
The group began work on Red Medicine in 1994, after touring in support of In on the Kill Taker. The writing of the album involved several months of jam sessions and recording at Guilford House, a secluded country estate located in Guilford, Connecticut.

The album's recording sessions took place from January to February 1995 at Inner Ear Studios in Arlington, Virginia. The band worked with the engineer Don Zientara, but did not choose to work with the producer Ted Niceley again. Fugazi opted to retreat from the in-your-face production values of In on the Kill Taker and instead worked to create an ambient sound which would display greater depth. To achieve this, the band handled the production themselves and, in doing so, became more confident with in-studio experimentation. This is evident in the incorporation of short, sampled segues, ("Do You Like Me", "Birthday Pony"), instruments such as the clarinet (as heard on "Version"), and alternate tunings used on songs such as "Latest Disgrace" and "By You". Footage of the band both writing and recording the album can be seen in the film Instrument.

Release

Critical reception

The album was a critical success: Mark Kemp of Rolling Stone called the album "rock solid". Andy Kellman of AllMusic wrote, "With more drive and playful goings-on, the arrangements sound much looser than on Kill Taker, while remaining just as gut-kicking and brainy."

Tour
Fugazi embarked on an extensive worldwide tour in support of the album, performing a total of 172 dates between March 1995 and November 1996.

Influence

Dennis Lyxzén of Refused considers Red Medicine to be his favorite Fugazi album and admitted that the band were influenced by it while recording Songs to Fan the Flames of Discontent and The Shape of Punk to Come. Mike Sullivan of Russian Circles cited the album, alongside Shellac's At Action Park, as a major influence on his guitar-playing, noting that they "literally changed the way [he] looked at music". John Frusciante described the album as a "masterpiece". Pelican's Trevor de Brauw included Red Medicine among the 10 albums that influenced his guitar-playing, praising the harmonized guitar-leads on the track "Long Distance Runner," calling them "so sparse but...so emotionally effective. Paired with the lyrics, it packed a real wallop." Travis Shettel of Piebald listed Red Medicine as one of three albums (the others being Frame and canvas by Braid and Here's Where the Strings Come In by Superchunk) that had a profound influence on their music-making, even admitting that they "stole more bits and pieces and ideas from these three albums than I would like to admit."

Both Refused and No Knife covered "Bed for the Scraping". Red Hot Chili Peppers play "Latest Disgrace" as the introduction to "Parallel Universe" on their Live at Slane Castle video.

Track listing 
All songs by Guy Picciotto, Ian MacKaye, Joe Lally, and Brendan Canty.

Personnel
Ian MacKaye – guitar, composer, vocals
Guy Picciotto – guitar, clarinet, composer, vocals
Joe Lally – bass guitar, composer, vocals
Brendan Canty – drums, composer

Technical
Jem Cohen – cover art, photography
Sly Dunbar – composer
Fugazi – cover art, mixing, photography, primary artist
Joey P. – photography
Robbie Shakespeare – composer
Don Zientara – engineer

Chart positions

Album

References

Fugazi albums
1995 albums
Dischord Records albums
Albums produced by Ian MacKaye
Art rock albums by American artists